Coatesville is a town in Clay Township, Hendricks County, Indiana, United States. The population was 523 at the 2010 Census.

History

Coatesville was founded in the late 1860s. It was incorporated as a town in 1909.

A gas station was opened in downtown Coatesville in the early 1900s.  By 1958 it was operated by Standard Oil.  At one time, Coatesville had three gas stations, but as of 2020 it has none.  The location of the town's first gas station has been renovated into a replica of the Standard  Oil station as it would have looked in the late 1950s.

On March 26, 1948 (Good Friday) a tornado destroyed most of the town, killing 14 residents. Damage and fatalities were widespread across west-central Indiana, and overall, 20 people perished.

Geography
Coatesville is located at  (39.687378, -86.669246).

Demographics

2010 census
As of the census of 2010, there were 523 people, 199 households, and 147 families living in the town. The racial makeup of the town was 96.7% White, 0.2% Asian, 1.5% from other races, and 1.5% from two or more races. Hispanic or Latino of any race were 1.3% of the population.

There were 199 households, of which 33.7% had children under the age of 18 living with them, 58.3% were married couples living together, 9.0% had a female householder with no husband present, 6.5% had a male householder with no wife present, and 26.1% were non-families. 23.1% of all households were made up of individuals, and 11.5% had someone living alone who was 65 years of age or older. The average household size was 2.63 and the average family size was 3.05.

The median age in the town was 41.4 years. 25.4% of residents were under the age of 18; 9.3% were between the ages of 18 and 24; 19.9% were from 25 to 44; 31.3% were from 45 to 64; and 14.1% were 65 years of age or older. The gender makeup of the town was 49.3% male and 50.7% female.

2000 census
As of the census of 2000, there were 516 people, 185 households, and 145 families living in the town. The racial makeup of the town was 98.64% White, 0.19% African American, 0.19% Native American, 0.19% from other races, and 0.78% from two or more races. Hispanic or Latino of any race were 0.39% of the population.

There were 185 households, out of which 42.2% had children under the age of 18 living with them, 64.9% were married couples living together, 9.2% had a female householder with no husband present, and 21.6% were non-families. 19.5% of all households were made up of individuals, and 9.2% had someone living alone who was 65 years of age or older. The average household size was 2.79 and the average family size was 3.21.

In the town, the population was spread out, with 32.0% under the age of 18, 9.3% from 18 to 24, 30.8% from 25 to 44, 18.4% from 45 to 64, and 9.5% who were 65 years of age or older. The median age was 31 years. For every 100 females, there were 96.2 males. For every 100 females age 18 and over, there were 84.7 males.

The median income for a household in the town was $40,357, and the median income for a family was $47,000. Males had a median income of $31,842 versus $23,750 for females. The per capita income for the town was $15,387. About 3.0% of families and 4.2% of the population were below the poverty line, including 4.6% of those under age 18 and 6.7% of those age 65 or over.

Education
The town has a lending library, the Coatesville-Clay Township Public Library.

References

External links
 Coatesville, Indiana History
 Mill Creek Community Historical Society
 Coatesville Town Website

Towns in Hendricks County, Indiana
Towns in Indiana
Indianapolis metropolitan area